The Neutral Water Health Resort Sanitarium, also known as Dr. Smith's Sanitarium Site, is a historic site located at the junction of Claudius Street and London Avenue in Egg Harbor City in Atlantic County, New Jersey. It was added to the National Register of Historic Places on March 20, 1991 for its significance in archaeology and health/medicine. It includes one contributing building, one contributing site, and three contributing structures. The last remaining building is now known as the Roundhouse Museum, operated by the Egg Harbor City Historical Society.

History and description
In 1905, Dr. Charles Smith built the Neutral Water Health Resort to treat patients with muscle problems. Patients would soak and walk in the serpentine canal to get the benefits of cedar water. The complex had several buildings, including a large sanitarium, sun house, several bath houses, and windmill. The polygonal sun house is the only remaining building. It has 12 sides on the first story, and 8 sides on the second. Dr. Smith operated the facility until 1921. The main sanitarium building was destroyed by fire .

In 2005, a park dedicated to Peace Pilgrim was established here, including the serpentine canal.

See also
 National Register of Historic Places listings in Atlantic County, New Jersey
 List of museums in New Jersey
 Peace Pilgrim

References

External links
 

Egg Harbor City, New Jersey
Buildings and structures in Atlantic County, New Jersey
National Register of Historic Places in Atlantic County, New Jersey
Museums in Atlantic County, New Jersey
New Jersey Register of Historic Places